Mary Mansfield Townsend Allen (July 16, 1851 – July 2, 1912) was an American author and composer who published her works under the names Marie Townsend and Mansfield Townsend.

Townsend was born in Canton, Pennsylvania, to Mary Ann Sharpe and Herman Townsend. She married William LeBaron Gibbs Allen on November 2, 1869, in Kidder, Missouri.

Townsend's publications include:

Opera 

Hawaii

Plays 

Bobs and Nabobs: A Domestic Drama in Four Acts
Ceramics, a Summer Idyll: An Original Comedy in Five Acts

Songs 

"Hammock Song"
"Summer Days"

References 

1851 births
1912 deaths
19th-century American composers
19th-century American women musicians
American opera composers
American writers
Pseudonyms
Women opera composers